Nicholas Pickering (born 4 August 1963 in South Shields) is a former professional footballer who played as a midfielder in the Football League for Sunderland, Coventry City, Derby County, Darlington and Burnley. He was capped once for the England national team, against Australia in 1983. He was part of the England U21 team that won the 1984 European under-21 championships and reached the semi-final two years later. As a Coventry City player he was on the winning side in the 1987 FA Cup Final.

After retiring as a player he returned to his native north-east, where he was involved in youth coaching and radio work.

In his first season in Sunderland's first team he had the honour of being voted both the club's young player of the year and player of the year by the fans.

References

External links
 
 

1963 births
Living people
Footballers from South Shields
English footballers
England international footballers
England under-21 international footballers
Association football midfielders
Sunderland A.F.C. players
Coventry City F.C. players
Derby County F.C. players
Darlington F.C. players
Burnley F.C. players
English Football League players
FA Cup Final players